Yeh Pyar Na Hoga Kam (English: This love will not diminish) is an Indian television series starring Yami Gautam and Gaurav Khanna which aired on the Colors TV. It premiered on 28 December 2009. The story is inspired from 2009 Bollywood flick Delhi-6

The show was based on the love story between Abeer (Gaurav Khanna) and Leher (Yami Gautam). It was one of the shows that replaced Bigg Boss 3 after its grand finale, the other show being Laagi Tujhse Lagan. The serial was quite popular among young generation due to its modern concept. Its original run ended on 25 September 2010 due to poor ratings in spite of good and innovative concept.

Overview
This is the story of Abeer and Leher's love set against the background of caste politics and class differences. The story unfolds in the picturesque township in Lucknow where a Brahmin's son Abeer falls for a Kayastha's daughter Leher. The show portrays the often heard though never-seen-before love story of people from different castes battling their own families and the society in order to unite. The story plays on the popular adage, 'Love is blind' but is also a scathing critique on our country's obsession with caste and class.

Abeer Bajpayee comes from a very wealthy family and being the family's only son gives him the benefit of being the apple of everyone's eyes. He is a student at the local university pursuing a degree in law so that he can follow his father's footsteps. Everybody likes to follow Abeer because he is popular.

The Bajpayees have a Kayasth family, the Mathurs, as their neighbor. There is a rift between both the families because of a building construction (common wall) problem, while building their houses. Mr. Kulbhushan Mathur and his family is delighted to receive his elder brother, Mr. Brijbhushan Mathur, who works in the electricity department and is transferred to Lucknow. Brijbhushan is accompanied by his wife (played by Prachi Shah) whom he lovingly calls 'Dulhan' and his two daughters, Guddan (Leher) and Bittan.

Abeer sees Leher when she is moving her luggage from the truck into the house and is attracted towards her. He even helps her unload the truck without her taking any notice and while helping her, he picks up her payal which falls to the ground in the rush and keeps it with him. He is really smitten by her and tries to talk to her so that he can know her name but she only brushes him away whenever he tries to even attempt to talk to her. She even doesn't tell him her name, until he knows it from Bittan. Abeer helps Leher's family with a lot of things much to the dislike of his family thereby creating a rift between him and his family. After a lot of drama, Abeer and Leher marry each other and the show progresses.

Cast
 Gaurav Khanna as Abeer Bajpayee
 Yami Gautam as Leher Mathur / Guddan (Leher Bajpayee after marrying Abeer)
 Parul Gulati as Bittan
 Bhupinder Singh as Triyogi Narayan Bajpayee (Abeer's father)
 Aishwarya Narkar as Sudha Triyogi Narayan Bajpayee
 Prachi Shah / Shweta Gautam as Mridula Mathur (Leher and Bittan's mother)
 Meeankshi Verma as Dadi
 Rajveer Singh Palawat as Banke
 Tushar Dalvi as Brijbhushan Mathur (Leher and Bittan's father)
 Rohitash Gaud as Kulbhushan Mathur (Brijbhushan's younger brother)
 Akhlaque Khan as Ankur Mathur (Kulbhushan's son)
 Indu Verma as Rama Mathur
 Puneet Tejwani as Madhav Shukla
 Amit Behl as Mr. Shukla (Madhav's father)
 Nupur Alankar as Mrs.Shukla (Madhav's mother)
 Chandan K Anand as Omi (The college goon)

References

External links
 News Article on Yeh Pyar Na Hoga Kam
 Yeh Pyar Na Hoga Kam to replace Bigg Boss 3
 Indu Verma in Yeh Pyar Na Hoga Kam
 Yeh Pyar Na Hoga Kam, website at Colors

Colors TV original programming
Indian drama television series
Indian television soap operas
2009 Indian television series debuts
2010 Indian television series endings